Route 335 is a north-south route from Montreal north into the Lanaudière region of Quebec.

South of the Metropolitan highway, the 335 runs on Saint Denis Street to its southern terminus. Northwards until the Rivière des Prairies, the 335 runs on Berri Street southbound and Lajeunesse Street northbound, then it crosses the Viau Bridge to Laval. There, the 335 once traced the entire length of the Laurentian Boulevard to the David Bridge on the Rivière des Mille Îles. Now, it runs north from the bridge to Autoroute 440 on Laurentian Boulevard. Between Dagenais and Autoroute 440, it is co-signed on Autoroute 19. North of the 440 until the David Bridge, it continues on the Autoroute 19 right-of-way, which is not yet signed as 19. North of the bridge, the 335 once ran along Montée Gagnon from Route 344 northwards. Now, between 344 and Autoroute 640, the 335 runs along the Autoroute 19 right-of-way. North of the 640 until the chemin de la Côte-St-Louis est, the 335 now runs along Laurentian Boulevard. North of chemin de la Côte-St-Louis, the 335 runs along Montée Gagnon and its traditional route.

Formerly Route 65, it was an alternative to Routes 11 and 18.

Municipalities along Route 335
* Montreal (Le Plateau-Mont-Royal / Rosemont–La Petite-Patrie / Villeray–Saint-Michel–Parc-Extension / Ahuntsic-Cartierville)
 Laval (Pont-Viau / Vimont / Auteuil)
 Bois-des-Filion
 Terrebonne
 Sainte-Anne-des-Plaines
 Terrebonne (La Plaine)
 Saint-Lin-Laurentides
 Saint-Calixte
 Chertsey

Major intersections

See also
 Athanase David Bridge
 List of Quebec provincial highways
 Pont Viau

References

External links

 Provincial Route Map (Courtesy of the Quebec Ministry of Transportation) 
 Route 335 on Google Maps.

335
Roads in Laval, Quebec
Roads in Montreal
Transport in Terrebonne, Quebec